Ashiya Station (芦屋駅) is the name of two train stations in Ashiya, Hyōgo, Japan:

 Ashiya Station (JR West)
 Ashiya Station (Hanshin)